Brickellia grandiflora, known by the common name tasselflower brickellbush, is a species of flowering plant in the family Asteraceae.

Description

The inflorescences at the tip of the slender stem holds clusters of nodding flower heads, each just over 1 cm long and lined with greenish phyllaries with curling tips. The bell-shaped flower head holds a spreading array of 20 to 40 disc florets. The bloom period is July to October.

The rust fungus Puccinia subdecora grows on Brickellia grandiflora.

Distribution and habitat 
The plant is widespread across much of western North America, found in western Canada (Alberta, British Columbia); northern Mexico (Baja California, Sonora, Chihuahua, Coahuila, Nuevo León, Tamaulipas); and the western and midwestern United States (primarily the Rocky Mountains and regions west through California, Oregon and Washington, with additional populations in New Mexico and Texas, and the central Great Plains (Nebraska, Kansas, Oklahoma) and the Ozarks (Missouri, Arkansas).

It can be found on forest banks and cliffs at relatively high elevations.

References

External links
Calflora Database: Brickellia grandiflora (Large flowered brickelbush, Tasselflower brickellbush)
Jepson Manual eFlora (TJM2) treatment of Brickellia grandiflora
USDA Plants Profile for Brickellia grandiflora (tasselflower brickellbush)
UC CalPhotos gallery of Brickellia grandiflora

grandiflora
Flora of the Western United States
Flora of the United States
Flora of the South-Central United States
Flora of Northeastern Mexico
Flora of Northwestern Mexico
Flora of Western Canada
Flora of California
Flora of the Great Plains (North America)
Flora of the Rocky Mountains
Flora of the Sierra Nevada (United States)
Plants described in 1834
Taxa named by William Jackson Hooker
Taxa named by Thomas Nuttall
Flora without expected TNC conservation status